Sir Edward Charles Kayll Ollivant  (1846–1915) was a senior member of the Indian Civil Service. He had notable interactions with both Mahatma Gandhi and Muhammed Ali Jinnah.

Ollivant arrived in India in 1881. In 1892, he had a disagreement in Rajkot with Gandhi, who was then a young barrister. The incident resulted in Gandhi being pushed out of a room, and ill feelings about this dispute were apparently a factor in Gandhi's departure for South Africa in 1893.

Ollivant also offered to hire Muhammed Ali Jinnah at 1,500 rupees per month, and was notably turned down.

Ollivant was a judicial member of the Council of the Governor of Bombay until April 1902, and a director of the Bombay, Baroda and Central India Railway. He was knighted as a Knight Commander of the Order of the Indian Empire (KCIE) in 1892.

See also
 Henry Northcote, 1st Baron Northcote, Governor of Bombay (1900–1903)

Notes

Indian Civil Service (British India) officers
Knights Commander of the Order of the Indian Empire
1846 births
Year of death missing
Members of the Bombay Legislative Council